Antarctaspis (meaning 'Antarctica's shield') is an extinct genus of placoderm fish which existed in Antarctica during the Devonian period. It was first named by Louis Agassiz in 1845, and the type species, Antarctaspis mcmurdoensis by White in 1986. It is known from a partial head shield.

The fossils were first discovered in the Lashly Mountains.

Recently, new types of placoderms related to Antarctaspis have been discovered in Australia. They may have been the same as Antarctaspis .sp, described in 1845.

References

Devonian placoderms
Fossil taxa described in 1845
Placoderm genera